The Zhongzheng Park is a park in Jinhu Township, Kinmen County, Taiwan.

History
The park was established in 1976 by Kinmen County Government. In 1986, to celebrate the 100th birthday of President Chiang Kai-shek, military and civilians planted trees in front of the park.

See also
 List of parks in Taiwan

References

1976 establishments in Taiwan
Jinhu Township
Parks established in 1976
Parks in Kinmen County